Pavel Zuyevich (born 12 July 1997) is a Belarusian professional footballer.

References

External links 
 
 

1997 births
Living people
Belarusian footballers
Association football forwards
FC Kletsk players
FC Krumkachy Minsk players
FC Slutsk players
FC Shakhtyor Petrikov players